Below is a list of footballers who have made 100 or more appearances for FC Universitatea Craiova. Players are listed according to the year in which they made their first-team debut.

External links
Romanian Soccer - History & Statistics

Universitatea Craiova
 
Association football player non-biographical articles